Santy S. Asanuma (born December 11, 1961) is a member of the Senate of Palau. Asanuma was born to Asanuma Asao, a businessman of Japanese-Palauan heritage, and his wife Sechedui, a member of Palau's Advisory Council.

References

External links
 Profile on senate's website

1961 births
Living people
Members of the Senate of Palau
Palauan politicians of Japanese descent